The 2018–19 USC Upstate Spartans men's basketball team represented the University of South Carolina Upstate during the 2018–19 NCAA Division I men's basketball season. The Spartans, led by first-year head coach Dave Dickerson, played their home games at the G. B. Hodge Center in Spartanburg, South Carolina as first-year members of the Big South Conference.

Previous season
The Spartans finished the 2017–18 season 7–25, 2–12 in ASUN play to finish in last place. They lost in the quarterfinals of the ASUN tournament to Florida Gulf Coast.

After the season, USC Upstate fired head coach Kyle Perry on March 1, less than five months after being named full-time head coach of the Spartans. On March 30, the school hired former Tulane head coach Dave Dickerson for the job.

This season marked the final season for USC Upstate as members of the Atlantic Sun Conference, as the school announced on November 15, 2017 that they will be moving to the Big South Conference for the 2018–19 season.

Roster

Schedule and results

|-
!colspan=9 style=| Non-conference regular season

|-
!colspan=9 style=| Big South Conference regular season

|-
!colspan=9 style=| Big South tournament

Despite both being members of the Big South, their meeting with Gardner–Webb on November 28 will be considered a non-conference game. The game was scheduled prior to USC Upstate joining the conference. Their meeting on January 12 will be a conference game.

References

USC Upstate Spartans men's basketball seasons
USC Upstate
Charleston Southern Buc South Carolina
Charleston Southern Buc South Carolina